WUAF-LP (107.9 FM) is a gospel music formatted radio station primarily serving the Lake City, Florida, area, owned by Angel Ministries of Lake City Inc.

External links
 WUAF-LP online
 

Gospel radio stations in the United States
UAF-LP
UAF-LP
Radio stations established in 2004
2004 establishments in Florida